Willowsia is a genus of slender springtails in the family Entomobryidae. There are about six described species in Willowsia.

Species
 Willowsia buski (Lubbock, 1870) (damp grain springtail)
 Willowsia jacobsoni (Borner, 1913)
 Willowsia kahlertae Christiansen & Bellinger, 1992
 Willowsia mekila Christiansen & Bellinger, 1992
 Willowsia nigromaculata (Lubbock, 1873)
 Willowsia platani (Nicolet, 1842)

References

Springtail genera